Nightwish is a band from Kitee, Finland, formed in 1996 by songwriter/keyboardist Tuomas Holopainen, guitarist Emppu Vuorinen, and former vocalist Tarja Turunen.

Although Nightwish has been prominent in their home country since the release of their first single, “The Carpenter” (1997) and debut album Angels Fall First, they did not achieve worldwide fame until the release of the albums Oceanborn, Wishmaster and Century Child, which were released in 1998, 2000 and 2002 respectively. Their 2004 album, Once, which has sold more than 1.3 million copies, led to Nightwish video clips being shown on MTV in the United States and inclusion of their music in US movie soundtracks. Their biggest US hit single, “Wish I Had an Angel” (2004), made it onto three US film soundtracks as a means to promote their North American tour. The band produced three more singles and two music videos for the album, as well as “Sleeping Sun”, from the 2005 “best of” compilation album, Highest Hopes, prior to vocalist Tarja Turunen’s dismissal.

In May 2007, former Alyson Avenue frontwoman, Anette Olzon, was revealed as Turunen’s replacement, and in the autumn, the band released a new album - Dark Passion Play, which has sold more than 2.0 million copies. The supporting tour started on October 6, 2007 and ended on September 19, 2009. A new E.P./live album, Made in Hong Kong (And in Various Other Places), was released in March 2009 as a MCD/DVD.

Nightwish has received eleven awards from both the Emma-gaala Awards, from thirteen nominations, and one Echo Awards from two nominations. Nightwish has also received 2 nominations from the Metal Hammer Golden God Awards but has not received an award; Nightwish already won awards from MTV Europe Music Awards and from World Music Awards.

Finnish awards

Emma-gaala Awards

The Emma-gaala is a Finnish music gala arranged yearly by IFPI Finland (ÄKT), awarding the most distinguished artists and music professionals of the year. It has been arranged since 1983, excluding the years 1988–1990.

Nightwish was nominated in 2003, 2005, 2008, 2013 and 2021:

The Mighty Metal Music Awards

"The Mighty Metal Music Awards" is a Finnish Heavy metal award from Helsinki:

Muuvi Awards

The "Muuvi Awards" is an annual Video awards from Helsinki:

MTV Awards

MTV Europe Music Awards

The MTV Europe Music Awards (EMA) were established in 1994 by MTV Networks Europe to celebrate the most popular music videos in Europe. Originally beginning as an alternative to the American MTV Video Music Awards, the MTV Europe Music Awards is today a popular celebration of what MTV viewers consider the best in music.

Unlike the VMAs, most of the awards are voted for by the viewers.

Other awards

Kerrang! Awards
The Kerrang! Awards is an annual awards ceremony held by Kerrang!, a British rock magazine. Nightwish has received one nomination.

|-
| 2005 || "Nemo" || Best Single || 
|}

Metal Storm Awards

Metal Storm hosts an annual award, where they appoint the album of the year for the different genres of metal. The official 10 nominees of each category are decided by the staff members and receives a brief description and if available a link to an official MetalStorm review. In additions to the official nominees, the users have the opportunity to supply "write-in" votes for bands not officially nominated.

Gold Awards
The "Gold Awards" is a New Zealand award, since 1999:

World Music Awards

The "World Music Awards" is an international awards show founded in 1989 that annually honors recording artists based on worldwide sales figures provided by the International Federation of the Phonographic Industry (IFPI).

Metal Hammer Golden Gods Awards

Echo Awards

References

External links
Nightwish Official Website

Nightwish
Awards